This is a list of roads designated M4:
 M4 (East London), a Metropolitan Route in East London, South Africa
 M4 (Cape Town), a Metropolitan Route in Cape Town, South Africa
 M4 (Pretoria), a Metropolitan Route in Pretoria, South Africa
 M4 (Durban), a Metropolitan Route in Durban, South Africa
 M4 (Port Elizabeth), a Metropolitan Route in Port Elizabeth, South Africa
 M4 motorway, United Kingdom
 M4 motorway (Hungary), or 2/A
 M4 motorway (Ireland)
 M-4 (Michigan highway), U.S.
 M4 motorway (Pakistan)
 M4 highway (Russia)
 M4 Motorway (Sydney), Australia
 Highway M04 (Ukraine)
 M-4 highway (Montenegro)
 M4 Motorway (Syria)
 M4 Road (Zambia)

See also
 List of highways numbered 4